General elections were held in South Africa between 26 and 29 April 1994. The elections were the first in which citizens of all races were allowed to take part, and were therefore also the first held with universal suffrage. The election was conducted under the direction of the Independent Electoral Commission (IEC), and marked the culmination of the four-year process that ended apartheid.

Millions queued in lines over a four-day voting period. Altogether, 19,726,579 votes were counted, and 193,081 were rejected as invalid.  As widely expected, the African National Congress (ANC), whose slate incorporated the labour confederation COSATU and the South African Communist Party, won a sweeping victory, taking 62 percent of the vote, just short of the two-thirds majority required to unilaterally amend the Interim Constitution.  As required by that document, the ANC formed a Government of National Unity with the National Party and the Inkatha Freedom Party, the two other parties that won more than 20 seats in the National Assembly. The governing National Party polled just over 20%, and was thus eligible for a post of Vice President to incumbent president De Klerk. The new National Assembly's first act was to elect Nelson Mandela as President, making him the country's first black chief executive.

The date 27 April is now a public holiday in South Africa, Freedom Day.

Background
The Inkatha Freedom Party (IFP) entered the election late, and it was added to the already-printed ballot papers by means of a sticker. In rural areas with limited infrastructure, people queued "for days" in order to vote.

The Conservative Party, the official opposition in the outgoing National Assembly, did not contest the elections. The Herstigte Nasionale Party, which had run in the white-only elections in 1989 also chose not to run.

Results

National Assembly
The 400 members of the National Assembly were chosen from party lists in proportion to each party's share of the national ballot.

Senate
The 90 members of the Senate were chosen, 10 from each province, by the newly elected provincial legislatures. Each province's Senate seats were allocated in proportion to the parties' representation in the provincial legislature.

In 1997, on the adoption of the final Constitution, the Senate became the National Council of Provinces; its political makeup remained the same, but members were divided into permanent and special delegates, as described in the following table.

Provincial legislature results
Members of the provincial legislatures were elected from party lists in proportion to each party's share of the provincial ballot.

Eastern Cape

Free State

Gauteng

KwaZulu/Natal

Mpumalanga

North-West

Northern Cape

Northern Province

Western Cape

Legacy
Following the elections, 27 April subsequently became a national public holiday, Freedom Day.

In a Sunday Independent article on the 20th anniversary of the election, Steven Friedman, who headed the IEC's information analysis department during the election, stated that the lack of a voters roll made verifying the results of the election difficult, and there were widespread accusations of cheating. Friedman characterised the election as a "technical disaster but a political triumph", and intimated that the final results were as a result of a negotiated compromise, rather than being an accurate count of the votes cast, stating that it was impossible to produce an accurate result under the circumstances that the election was held. He wrote that he believed that the result of the election, which gave KwaZulu-Natal to the IFP; gave the National Party 20% of the vote share, and a Deputy President position; and held the ANC back from the two-thirds majority with the ability to unilaterally write the final constitution, helped prevent a civil war.

References

External links

US Department of the Army, South Africa Country Study, "The 1994 Elections"
IEC results for 1994 election
Proportional representation and alternative systems

South Africa
Democratization
General elections in South Africa
South Africa